The Farmer's Daughter is an American sitcom, loosely based on the identically titled 1947 film, that was produced by Screen Gems Television and aired on ABC from September 20, 1963, to April 22, 1966. It was sponsored by Lark Cigarettes and Clairol, for whom the two leading stars often appeared at the show's end, promoting the products; the commercials were also filmed. The Farmer's Daughter also enjoyed a brief run in syndication when it aired on CBN Cable in the 1980s.

Overview
The series stars Inger Stevens as Katy Holstrum, a young Swedish woman who becomes the housekeeper for widowed congressman Glen Morley (played by William Windom). Glen has two sons, age 14 and 8 at the time of the premiere. Steve, the older of the two boys, is played by Mickey Sholdar, and Danny is played by Rory O'Brien. The congressman's mother Agatha Morley is played by Cathleen Nesbitt.

In its first season (filmed in black-and-white), The Farmer's Daughter competed against The Twilight Zone on CBS and the short-lived Larry Blyden series Harry's Girls on NBC. The series never reached the top 30 in ratings, but during its first two years it earned respectable ratings and proved to be moderately successful. The last episode of the second season (which was also filmed in black-and-white) featured the two lead characters becoming engaged.

The third season brought some changes to the format, as the series began filming episodes in color. However, the third and fourth episodes had been shot in black-and-white. On the November 5, 1965, episode (just in time for sweeps), Katy Holstrum and Glen Morley were married in a wedding ceremony attended by 300 guests. Network censors objected to the original script of the honeymoon episode that had Glen bringing his new bride to a hotel room with twin beds and then saying, "But I asked for a double bed!" Forbidding use of the word "bed," the censors allowed it to be replaced with "accommodations," along with a glance at the bed.

After the wedding episode, the show's ratings fell, and ABC canceled The Farmer's Daughter. In the penultimate episode, "Is He or Isn't He?", Katy adopts Glen's sons, providing the series closure as well as a happy ending.

Unlike the 1947 film, Katy never ran for (nor was elected to) Congress in the series.

Cast

 Inger Stevens as Katrin "Katy" Holstrum (later, Morley)
 William Windom as Glen Morley
 Mickey Sholdar as Steve Morley
 Rory O'Brien as Danny Morley
 Cathleen Nesbitt as Agatha Morley
 Philip Coolidge as Cooper, the butler (1963–1964)

Episodes

Season 1 (1963–64)
All episodes in black-and-white

Season 2 (1964–65)
All episodes in black-and-white

Season 3 (1965–66)
The third and fourth episodes in black-and-white, the remainder in color

Awards and nominations

References
Notes

External links

1963 American television series debuts
1966 American television series endings
1960s American sitcoms
American Broadcasting Company original programming
Black-and-white American television shows
English-language television shows
Live action television shows based on films
Television series by Sony Pictures Television
Television series by Screen Gems
Domestic workers in fiction
Television series about widowhood